The Guardian Fiction Prize was a literary award sponsored by The Guardian newspaper. Founded in 1965, it recognized one fiction book per year written by a British or Commonwealth writer and published in the United Kingdom. The award ran for 33 years before being terminated.

In 1999, the Guardian replaced the Fiction Prize with the Guardian First Book Award, for début works of both fiction and non-fiction, which was discontinued in 2016, with the 2015 awards being the last.

Guardian Fiction Prize winners

1965: Clive Barry, Crumb Borne
1966: Archie Hind, The Dear Green Place
1967: Eva Figes, Winter Journey
1968: P. J. Kavanagh, A Song and a Dance
1969: Maurice Leitch, Poor Lazarus
1970: Margaret Blount, When Did You Last See your Father?
1971: Thomas Kilroy, The Big Chapel
1972: John Berger, G
1973: Peter Redgrove, In the Country of the Skin
1974: Beryl Bainbridge, The Bottle Factory Outing
1975: Sylvia Clayton, Friends and Romans
1976: Robert Nye, Falstaff
1977: Michael Moorcock, The Condition of Muzak
1978: Roy Heath, The Murderer
1979: Neil Jordan, Night in Tunisia and Dambudzo Marechera, The House of Hunger
1980: J. L. Carr, A Month in the Country
1981: John Banville, Kepler
1982: Glyn Hughes, Where I Used to Play on the Green
1983: Graham Swift, Waterland
1984: J. G. Ballard, Empire of the Sun
1985: Peter Ackroyd, Hawksmoor
1986: Jim Crace, Continent
1987: Peter Benson, The Levels
1988: Lucy Ellmann, Sweet Desserts
1989: Carol Lake, Rosehill: Portrait from a Midlands City
1990: Pauline Melville, Shape-Shifter
1991: Alan Judd, The Devil's Own Work
1992: Alasdair Gray, Poor Things
1993: Pat Barker, The Eye in the Door
1994: Candia McWilliam, Debatable Land
1995: James Buchan, Heart's Journey in Winter
1996: Seamus Deane, Reading in the Dark
1997: Anne Michaels, Fugitive Pieces
1998: Jackie Kay, Trumpet

References

 
Commonwealth literary awards
Literary awards by magazines and newspapers
British fiction awards
Awards established in 1965
1965 establishments in the United Kingdom
1998 disestablishments in the United Kingdom
The Guardian awards